Jamie Grant (born 1970) is a retired Australian footballer.

Jamie Grant may also refer to:

 Jamie Grant (actress) (born 1986), Dutch actress starring in Flikken Maastricht
 Jamie Grant (comics), Scottish comics artist, see Alan Grant
 Jamie Grant, politician in Florida

See also
 James Grant (disambiguation)